The 2017 MTV Video Music Awards Japan was held in Tokyo on September 27, 2017.

Main Awards

Best Video of the Year
Gen Hoshino — "Family song"

Best Male Video
Japan
Gen Hoshino — "Family song"

Best Female Video
Japan
Kana Nishino — "Package"

Best Group Video
Japan
Momoiro Clover Z — "Blast!"

Best New Artist Video
Japan
THE RAMPAGE from EXILE TRIBE — "Lightning"

Best Rock Video
WANIMA — CHARM"

Best Alternative Video
Rekishi - KATOKU

Best Metal Video
METALLICA — "Hardwired"

Best Pop Video
ED SHEERAN — "Shape of You"

Best R&B Video
Daichi Miura — "(RE)PLAY"

Best Hip Hop Video
KICK THE CAN CREW — "thousand%"

Best Dance Video
MONDO GROSSO — "labyrinth"

Best Choreography
Gen Hoshino — "Koi (song)"

Best Collaboration Video

Hikaru Utada - Forget ft.  KOHH

Special awards

Inspired Award
BUCK-TICK

Best Buzz Award
Keyakizaka46

References

2017 in Japanese music
2017 music awards